My Son, the Nut is the third album by Allan Sherman, released by Warner Bros. Records in 1963. The album held the top spot on the Billboard Top 200 for nearly two months, from August 31 to October 25, 1963. It stayed on the charts for 140 weeks and sold 1.2 million copies. My Son, the Nut was also the last comedy album to hit #1 on the Billboard 200 for over half a century, until "Weird Al" Yankovic's Mandatory Fun in 2014.

Unlike Sherman's first two albums, which had been filled with in-jokes about Jewish culture, on his third album, his parodies became more generic.

Track listing

Side one
 "You Went the Wrong Way, Old King Louie" ("La Marseillaise," "You Came a Long Way from St. Louis," and the Peter Gunn theme)
 "Automation" ("Fascination")
 "I See Bones" ("C'est si bon")
 "Hungarian Goulash No 5" ("Brahms Hungarian Dance Number 5")
 "Headaches" ("Heartaches")
 "Here's to the Crabgrass" ("Country Gardens") (duet with Jacqueline Ward)

Side two
"Hello Muddah, Hello Fadduh! (A Letter from Camp)" ("Dance of the Hours")
 "One Hippopotami" ("What Kind of Fool Am I?"")
 "Rat Fink" ("Rag Mop")
 "You're Getting to Be a Rabbit with Me" ("You're Getting to Be a Habit with Me")
 "Eight Foot Two, Solid Blue" ("Five Foot Two, Eyes of Blue")
 "Hail to Thee, Fat Person" (spoken, with an instrumental rendition of "America the Beautiful" behind it)

Chart history

References

1963 albums
Allan Sherman albums
Warner Records albums
1960s comedy albums